T. fenestrata may refer to:
 Tabellaria fenestrata, a diatom species in the genus Tabellaria
 Tectura fenestrata, Reeve, 1855, a sea snail species in the genus Tectura
 Teucholabis fenestrata, Osten Sacken, 1888, a crane fly species in the genus Teucholabis
 Trentepohlia fenestrata, Alexander, 1956, a crane fly species in the genus Trentepohlia

See also
 Fenestrata (disambiguation)